Nils F. Ambursen (February 6, 1876 – January 17, 1953) was a Norwegian-American civil engineer and inventor. He was the founder of Ambursen Hydraulic Construction Company and was known for his influential dam designs in the early 20th century.

Early life and education
Ambursen was born at  Fredrikstad in  Østfold, Norway and was educated at the Telemark Civil Engineering College  (Telemark ingeniørhøgskolein) in Skien, Telemark. Ambursen came to the United States by the age of 21.

Career
Working for the B. F. Sturtevant Company in Hyde Park, Boston, Massachusetts, in 1903, Ambursen developed an innovative concrete slab and buttress dam for an industrial client in Theresa, New York.
   Ambursen's design was for a buttress dam requiring minimal buttress thickness in which the upstream part is a relatively thin flat slab typically made of reinforced concrete. Ambursen's concrete-slab-and-buttress design used far less material than a traditional gravity dam making it both a significant engineering advance and cost effective for clients.

Ambursen promptly filed a patent on his own behalf and organized the Ambursen Hydraulic Construction Company, based in Boston. From 1903 through 1917, the company used the technique to construct more than one hundred dams in North America, most in New England. The record-breaking  La Prele Dam in Converse County, Wyoming used 43 percent less concrete than an equivalent concrete gravity dam.

The structure allowed an interior hollow under the spillway; the 1907 Bloede's Dam on the Patapsco River in Maryland housed its hydroelectric power plant inside that hollow and therefore "under water". The company sued to preserve its patents fairly aggressively but with mixed success.  In some cases, the Ambursen dam became a more generic "Ambursen type", for instance at the 1911 Lock and Dam No. 1 on the Upper Mississippi River between Minneapolis and Saint Paul, Minnesota.  Civil engineer George Freeman received his own November 1912 patent on a modified version of the concrete buttress dam used there.

In 1917, Ambursen left his company, which has continued to bear his name for over a hundred years. Today perhaps fifty Ambursen-type dams from the post-World War II era stand outside the United States. The tallest example, is the 1948 Escaba Dam (Dique Escaba) in Tucumán, Argentina.

Work 

Ambursen's designs include:

(all dams listed located in the United States)

 Warrior Ridge Dam (1906) in Huntingdon County, Pennsylvania; "the focus of widespread attention in the engineering press"
 Ellsworth Dam (1907)  in Ellsworth, Maine
 Bloede's Dam (1907) in  Ilchester, Maryland
Ashley Dam (1907-1908; undermined 1909) on the Housatonic River near Pittsfield, Massachusetts
 La Prele Dam (1908–1909; refurbished in 1977)   near Douglas, Wyoming
 Rapidan Dam (1908 - 1910) on the Blue Earth River, Rapidan Township, Minnesota
 River Mill Dam (1911) in  Estacada, Oregon; on the National Register of Historic Places
 Powersite Dam (1911–1913) in Forsyth, Missouri
 Overholser Dam (1917–1918) in Oklahoma City, Oklahoma; on the National Register of Historic Places
 Remmel Dam (1924)  impounding Lake Catherine, Jones Mill, Arkansas; on the National Register of Historic Places
Stony Gorge Dam (1926-1928) in Glenn County, California.

See also

 List of civil engineers
 List of inventors
 List of Norwegians
 List of people from Boston

References

External links
Introduction to Buttress Dams

Related reading
Lyon,  William K.;  George W Petersen  (1921) Comparative designs of Gravity and Ambursen dams  (Armour Institute of Technology)  
Hager, Willi H.   (2015) Hydraulicians in the USA 1800-2000: A biographical dictionary of leaders in hydraulic engineering and fluid mechanics  (Boca Raton, FL: CRC Press) 

1876 births
1953 deaths
People from Fredrikstad
People from Skien
People from Boston
American civil engineers
American company founders
20th-century American inventors
American patent holders
Concrete pioneers
Place of death missing
Norwegian civil engineers
Norwegian inventors
Norwegian emigrants to the United States
19th-century Norwegian people
19th-century American engineers
20th-century American engineers